The 2010 Pan-American Volleyball Cup was the fifth edition of the annual men's volleyball tournament, played by nine countries over May 22–30, 2010, in San Juan, Puerto Rico. The event served as a qualifier for the 2011 FIVB World League Qualification.

Teams

Squads

Preliminary round

Pool A

|}

Pool B

|}

Pool C

|}

Final round

Championship bracket

7th–9th places bracket

7th–9th places

Quarterfinals

Semifinals

7th place

5th place

3rd place

Final

Final standing

Puerto Rico qualified for the 2011 FIVB World League qualification.

Awards
MVP:  Jayson Jablonsky
Best Scorer:  Victor Rivera
Best Spiker:  Jayson Jablonsky
Best Blocker:  Gustavo Bonatto
Best Server:  Mariano Giustiniano
Best Digger:  Mario Becerra
Best Setter:  Pedro Rangel
Best Receiver:  Gregory Berrios
Best Libero:  Gregory Berrios
Rising Star:  Henderson Espinoza

References

External links
Official website

Men's Pan-American Volleyball Cup
P
V
International volleyball competitions hosted by Puerto Rico